Lane in Autumn is an oil painting created in 1884 by Vincent van Gogh.

See also
 List of works by Vincent van Gogh

External links 
 

Paintings by Vincent van Gogh
1884 paintings